Richard de Clare may refer to:

 Richard fitz Gilbert (1030–1091), lord of Clare and of Tonbridge, ancestor of the Clare family
 Richard Fitz Gilbert de Clare (died 1136), a.k.a. Richard de Clare, 1st Earl of Hertford, Anglo-Norman lord
 Richard de Clare, 2nd Earl of Pembroke (1130–1176), Anglo-Norman lord known as "Strongbow"
 Richard de Clare, 3rd Earl of Hertford (1153–1217), known as Earl of Clare, led in negotiations for Magna Carta
 Richard de Clare, 5th Earl of Hertford (1222–1262), also 2nd Earl of Gloucester
 Richard de Clare, Steward of Forest of Essex (1278–1318), killed at the Battle of Dysert O'Dea in Ireland

See also
 de Clare